Kwon Chung-hyok (born 21 January 1994) is a North Korean footballer. He represented North Korea on at least two occasions in 2013.

Career statistics

International

References

External links

1994 births
Living people
Sportspeople from Pyongyang
North Korean footballers
North Korea youth international footballers
North Korea international footballers
Association football defenders
April 25 Sports Club players